Acta Philosophica is a biannual peer-reviewed academic journal that was established in 1992. The editor-in-chief is Francesco Russo (Pontifical University of the Holy Cross). The journal publishes articles in  Italian, English, Spanish, and French on all aspects of philosophy, especially concerning science and faith.

Abstracting and indexing 
The journal is abstracted and indexed in:
 Arts and Humanities Citation Index
 Current Contents/Arts and Humanities
 MLA International Bibliography
 Scopus
 The Philosopher's Index

External links 
 
 

Philosophy journals
Biannual journals
Publications established in 1992
Multilingual journals